The 1981 USA Outdoor Track and Field Championships took place between June 20–21 at Hughes Stadium on the campus of Sacramento City College in Sacramento, California. The 20K racewalk was held May 3 in Kenosha, Wisconsin.  The decathlon was held at the University of California, Santa Barbara on June 27-8.  The meet was organized by The Athletics Congress.

In addition to being the National Championship, it was the selection meet to international teams including the 1981 IAAF World Cup.

This meet was headlined by Carl Lewis, who would dominate the headlines in the sport for the next decade and a half.

Results

Men track events

Men field events

Women track events

Women field events

See also
United States Olympic Trials (track and field)

References

 Results from T&FN
 results

USA Outdoor Track and Field Championships
Usa Outdoor Track And Field Championships, 1981
Track and field
Track and field in California
Outdoor Track and Field Championships
Outdoor Track and Field Championships
Sports competitions in California